Mark Angel (born 27 May 1991) is a Nigerian comedian, scriptwriter, and video producer. He is best known for the Mark Angel Comedy series of shorts on YouTube, often featuring child comedians such as his cousin, Emmanuella Samuel (age ), his niece, and her cousin "Aunty" Success Madubuike (age 8). Angel's YouTube channel was the first African comedy channel to reach one million subscribers. Mark angel also has a wife who also acts comedy at mark angel comedy caretaker series with his fellow actors which are Mr Azu, Baze10, Ebere, The Law, Mimi, Kingsley Brown.

Early and personal life
Angel was born in 1991 in Port Harcourt, Rivers State, Nigeria. He attended Obafemi Awolowo University to study medicine, but left for family reasons. After college, he studied cinematography in India and spent time in Nigeria gaining experience in cinematography and theater, but could not find stable paying work in Nollywood. He began independent filmmaking in 2013 under his studio, Mechanic Pictures. He is a supporter of Chelsea FC.

He can understand both Igbo and Yoruba, the two most-spoken native languages in Nigeria.

Mark Angel Comedy
Angel is best known for Mark Angel Comedy, a series of YouTube comedy shorts that feature a number of people from Angel's family and neighborhood in Port Harcourt. Many of the shorts involve clever children, primarily Emmanuella and Success.

Angel's first well known short is "Oga Landlord," wherein a man late on rent (Angel) is trying to hide from his landlord (Daddy Humble), and tries in vain to have a child (Emmanuella) cover for him (e.g. "My uncle is not around. He just told me.").

Samuel is Angel's longest-appearing actress. She has won comedy awards in Nigeria and Australia for her work with Angel, and is Africa's youngest YouTube award winner. She started film work in school as part of a class video project, prior to being chosen by Angel for his stable of actors. Samuel's videos often reach up to a million views in the first week after posting.

Mark Angel Comedy received a plaque from YouTube for having reached one million subscriptions in 2017. It was the first Nigerian-based YouTube channel to reach that threshold.

In 2018 it was announced that Samuel would be attached to an upcoming Disney feature film.
On 2 April 2020, during the COVID-19 lockdowns, Emmanuella, Success, and Regina Daniels were featured in a skit by Ofego titled "Lockdown" on his YouTube channel, using archive footage.

1xBet ambassador 

In the summer of 2021, Mark Angel signed a contract with 1xBet, an online gambling company popular in Nigeria.

Social media presence 
Angel has tens of millions of followers on social media, including 12 million followers on Facebook, 1.5 million on Instagram,  1 million on TikTok, and 8 million subscribers on YouTube.

Film style 

Mark Angel works mostly with multiple camera formats and close camera angles. Filming sometimes includes shaky camera techniques to give them a natural and down-to-earth feel, something Angel calls "freestyle comedy."

Angel primarily films within his family's lower-class neighbourhood in Port Harcourt, as a means to portray the environment he grew up in and relate to other common people in Nigeria.

References

External links
 
 

1991 births
Living people
Nigerian film producers
Nigerian male comedians
People from Port Harcourt
People from Rivers State
Comedy YouTubers
Nigerian YouTubers
Nigerian media personalities
Nigerian screenwriters
Igbo comedians
Igbo people